In enzymology, a glyoxylate oxidase is an enzyme that catalyzes the chemical reaction

glyoxylate + H2O + O2  oxalate + H2O2

The 3 substrates of this enzyme are glyoxylate, H2O, and O2, whereas its two products are oxalate and H2O2.

This enzyme belongs to the family of oxidoreductases, specifically those acting on the aldehyde or oxo group of donor with oxygen as acceptor.  The systematic name of this enzyme class is glyoxylate:oxygen oxidoreductase. This enzyme participates in glyoxylate and dicarboxylate metabolism.

References

 

EC 1.2.3
Enzymes of unknown structure